Is It Still Good to Ya is the sixth studio album recorded by American vocal duo Ashford & Simpson, released in 1978 on the Warner Bros. label. The album was remastered and reissued with bonus tracks in 2015 by Big Break Records.

Chart performance
The album peaked at No. 1 on the R&B albums chart. It also reached No. 20 on the Billboard 200. The album features the single, "It Seems to Hang On", which peaked at No. 2 on the Hot Soul Singles chart. The title track also charted at No. 12 on the Hot Soul Singles chart.

The title track was subsequently covered by Teddy Pendergrass, in a version produced by the duo on his 1980 album T.P. which peaked at No. 3 on the R&B albums chart and No. 14 on the Billboard 200.

Track listing

Personnel
Ashford & Simpson - vocals
Eric Gale - guitar
Francisco Centeno - bass
Valerie Simpson - piano
Ray Chew - Fender Rhodes, synthesizer
John Sussewell, Steve Jordan - drums
Ralph MacDonald - percussion
John Davis, William Slapin - horns
Ashford & Simpson, Ray Simpson, Ullanda McCullough - backing vocals

Charts

Weekly charts

Year-end charts

Singles

See also
List of number-one R&B albums of 1978 (U.S.)

References

External links
 

1978 albums
Ashford & Simpson albums
Albums arranged by Paul Riser
Albums produced by Ashford & Simpson
Albums recorded at Sigma Sound Studios
Warner Records albums